Events in 2013 in anime.

Accolades  
Internationally, Patema Inverted and The Wind Rises were nominated for the Asia Pacific Screen Award for Best Animated Feature Film. The Wind Rises was also in competition for the Golden Lion at the 70th Venice International Film Festival. The Wind Rises won the New York Film Critics Circle Award for Best Animated Film and was nominated for the Golden Globe Award for Best Foreign Language Film. The Wind Rises and A Letter to Momo have been nominated for the Annie Award for Best Animated Feature at the 41st Annie Awards. The Wind Rises has also been nominated for the Academy Award for Best Animated Feature and Possessions has been nominated for the Academy Award for Best Animated Short Film at the 86th Academy Awards.

Releases

Films
A list of anime that debuted in theaters between January 1 and December 31, 2013.

Television series
A list of anime television series that debuted between January 1 and December 31, 2013.

Original video animations
A list of original video animations that debuted between January 1 and December 31, 2013.

Highest-grossing films
The following are the 10 highest-grossing anime films of 2013 by Japan gross are as follows:

See also
2013 in Japanese television
2013 in British television
2013 in Wales
2013 in Mexican television
2013 in Spanish television
2013 in Catalonia
2013 in animation
2013 in manga
2013 in television

References

External links 
Japanese animated works of the year, listed in the IMDb

Years in anime
2013 in animation
2013 in Japan